The 2022 Texas A&M–Corpus Christi Islanders baseball team represented Texas A&M University–Corpus Christi during the 2022 NCAA Division I baseball season. The Islanders played their home games at Chapman Field and were led by fifteenth–year head coach Scott Malone. They were members of the Southland Conference.

Preseason

Southland Conference Coaches Poll
The Southland Conference Coaches Poll is to be released in the winter of 2022.

Preseason All-Southland Team & Honors

First Team
Hayden Thomas – Pitcher
Josh Caraway – Utility

Second Team
Justin Taylor – Catcher
Brendan Ryan – Outfielder
Jaime Ramirez – Pitcher

Personnel

Schedule and results

Schedule Source:
*Rankings are based on the team's current ranking in the D1Baseball poll.

References

Texas AandM-Corpus Christi
Texas A&M–Corpus Christi Islanders baseball seasons
Texas AandM-Corpus Christi Islanders baseball